A Map of the World is a 1999 American drama film, based on the 1994 novel of the same name by Jane Hamilton. Directed by Scott Elliott and produced by Kathleen Kennedy and Frank Marshall, the film stars Sigourney Weaver, Julianne Moore and David Strathairn. Weaver was nominated for a Golden Globe Award for Best Actress in a Motion Picture Drama for her performance.

Synopsis 
Alice Goodwin is a school nurse who lives with her husband Howard and two girls on a small dairy farm in Wisconsin. After the death of the daughter of her friend Theresa Collins on Alice's property, the couple watch helplessly as the community turns against them. To make matters worse, Alice finds herself fighting charges of child abuse.

Cast

In addition, the young daughters of Weaver's character were played by real life sisters Dara and Kayla Perlmutter.

Reception

Critical response
On Rotten Tomatoes, 66% of 56 reviews are positive, and the average rating is 6.4/10. The critics consensus states, "Disjointed storytelling overshadows noteworthy performances." On Metacritic, the film has an average score of 65 based on reviews from 25 critics, indicating "generally favorable reviews".

Film critic Roger Ebert gave the film three and a half out of four stars, praising the performances, and likening it to such movies as Being John Malkovich and Three Kings in "being free—in being capable of taking any turn at any moment, without the need to follow tired conventions".

Awards and nominations

References

External links
 
 

1999 films
Films based on American novels
Films produced by Kathleen Kennedy
Films produced by Frank Marshall
Films set in Wisconsin
Films shot in Toronto
1999 directorial debut films
1990s English-language films